Telephone numbers in Abkhazia can be accessed through codes operated by Georgia and Russia. The international numbering format is +995 44X 2XXXXX and +7 N40 XXX-XX-XX.

References

Abkhazia
Abkhazia-related lists